Lágrimas de amor (English title: Tears of love) is a Mexican telenovela produced by Irene Sabido for Televisa in 1980.

Cast 
Alicia Rodríguez as Camila
Gustavo Rojo as German
Virginia Manzano as Lidia
Silvia Mariscal as Cecilia
Fabian Lavalle as Raul
Martha Roth as Luz
Carlos Amador as Chucho
Antonio Henaine as Gustavo
Agustín López Zavala as Dr.Lazcano
Leonor Llausas as Soledad
Paloma Woolrich

References

External links 

Mexican telenovelas
1980 telenovelas
Televisa telenovelas
Spanish-language telenovelas
1980 Mexican television series debuts
1980 Mexican television series endings